Llanquihue is a Chilean commune and city in Llanquihue Province, Los Lagos Region. The city lies on the western shore of Lake Llanquihue, where the Maullín River starts.

History
On 19 June 1968, the government promulgated the law creating the Commune of Llanquihue. The National Congress approved the bill, which in its first article states: Commune Llanquihue Puerto Varas, Llanquihue Province, the capital is the town of Llanquihue.

A dialect of German is spoken by the people of this commune.

Demographics
Of these, 12,728 (77.9%) lived in urban areas and 3,609 (22.1%) in rural areas. The population grew by 13.6% (1,951 persons) between the 1992 and 2002 censuses.

Administration
As a commune, Llanquihue is a third-level administrative division of Chile administered by a municipal council, headed by an alcalde who is directly elected every four years. The 2021–2024 alcalde is Victor Angulo Muñoz (Ind.).

Within the electoral divisions of Chile, Llanquihue is represented in the Chamber of Deputies by Fidel Espinoza (PS) and Carlos Recondo (UDI) as part of the 56th electoral district, together with Puyehue, Río Negro, Purranque, Puerto Octay, Fresia, Frutillar, Puerto Varas and Los Muermos. The commune is represented in the Senate by Camilo Escalona Medina (PS) and Carlos Kuschel Silva (RN) as part of the 17th senatorial constituency (Los Lagos Region).

Education
Previously the area had a German school, Deutsche Schule Llanquihue.

References

External links

  Municipality of Llanquihue

Communes of Chile
Populated places in Llanquihue Province
Populated lakeshore places in Chile
1968 establishments in Chile
Populated places established in 1968